Livingstone College is a private, historically black Christian college in Salisbury, North Carolina. It is affiliated with the African Methodist Episcopal Zion Church. Livingstone College is accredited by the Commission on Colleges of the Southern Association of Colleges and Schools to award the Bachelor of Arts, Bachelor of Science, Bachelor of Fine Arts, and Bachelor of Social Work degrees.

History
Livingstone College along with Hood Theological Seminary began as Zion Wesley Institute in Concord, North Carolina in 1879. After fundraising by Dr. Joseph C. Price and Bishop J. W. Hood, the school was closed in Concord and re-opened in 1882 a few miles north in Salisbury.

Zion Wesley Institute was founded by the African Methodist Episcopal (AME) Zion Church. The institute changed its name to Livingstone College in 1887 to honor African missionary David Livingstone. That same year, the school granted its first degree. The first group of students to graduate included eight men and two women, the first black women to earn bachelor's degrees in North Carolina.

Originally beginning with 40 acres on a Salisbury farm called Delta Grove, Livingstone College's main campus now consists of 272 acres.

In August 2014, Livingstone submitted plans for converting a former Holiday Inn on Jake Alexander Boulevard into a hospitality school. Livingstone's School of Hospitality Management & Culinary Arts, a program accredited in 2012, had moved to the new location by 2015.

Livingstone College Historic District
The Livingstone College Historic District is a national historic district listed on the National Register of Historic Places in 1982.  The district encompasses 16 contributing buildings, 1 contributing structure, and 1 contributing object on the Livingstone College campus and adjacent residential sections in Salisbury.  Notable buildings include the Price house (1884), Harris house (1889), Aggrey house (1912), Ballard Hall (1887), Dodge Hall (1886), Carnegie Library (1908), Goler Hall (1917), Hood Building (1910), and Price Memorial Building (1930-1943).

Student activities 
The college offers a number of opportunities for students to participate in religious, social, cultural, recreational, and athletic activities.

Additionally, outstanding artists and lecturers are brought to campus to perform each year.  Included in the Division of Student Services are Residence Life, Health Services, Student Activities/Smith Anderson Clark Student Center, Campus Ministry, and the Counseling Center.

Athletics 
On the campus is an athletic marker erected in 1956 to commemorate the first African-American intercollegiate football game, in 1892.

Livingstone is a member of the National Collegiate Athletic Association (NCAA), Division II, and the Central Intercollegiate Athletic Association (CIAA). Its intercollegiate sports programs include basketball, bowling, cross-country, football, softball, volleyball, tennis, golf, and track and field.  The nickname for the school's teams is the Blue Bears.

The Livingstone College football team has had a long history since playing in the first Black college football game in 1892 against Johnson C. Smith University (then called Biddle University).   The rivalry between the two schools continues to this day as the Commemorative Classic.  The Blue Bears also maintain a rivalry with their cross town rival Catawba College Indians.  The early October game between the two schools is called the Mayors' Cup.

The current football stadium that the university uses for matches is the Alumni Memorial Stadium (Livingstone)

Notable alumni

Notable faculty

References

External links 

 
 Official athletics website

 
Historically black universities and colleges in the United States
Universities and colleges accredited by the Southern Association of Colleges and Schools
Educational institutions established in 1879
Salisbury, North Carolina
Universities and colleges in Rowan County, North Carolina
1879 establishments in North Carolina
University and college buildings on the National Register of Historic Places in North Carolina
Historic districts on the National Register of Historic Places in North Carolina
National Register of Historic Places in Rowan County, North Carolina
Liberal arts colleges in North Carolina
Private universities and colleges in North Carolina
African Methodist Episcopal Zion Church